The Magic Garden is the second album by American pop group the 5th Dimension, released in 1967 (see 1967 in music). A concept album, it tells the story of a couple's love and the end of their relationship. In more recent discussions of the album, that love affair is said to be about Jimmy Webb — who composed all but one of the album's songs — and his time with singer and then-girlfriend Susan Horton (the song "Dreams/Pax/Nepenthe" refers to a Susan). The album's one track not credited to Jimmy Webb, a cover of Lennon–McCartney's "Ticket to Ride", was originally intended for the group's debut album, Up, Up and Away.

Following the success of Up, Up and Away, which spawned two Top-20 singles on the Billboard Pop Chart, expectations were high for The Magic Garden. However, the album just missed the Billboard Hot 100, and no Top 20 singles emerged from it in the US. The first single, "Paper Cup", rose only to #34. "Carpet Man", the album's second single, landed at #29 in the US but found great success in Canada, charting at #3 on Toronto's CHUM chart and #11 on the RPM chart, in March 1968. The group performed the song on Kraft Music Hall (on an episode hosted by John Davidson) and The Ed Sullivan Show.

The Worst That Could Happen
One of the album's cuts, "The Worst That Could Happen", was released as a single by the Brooklyn Bridge in December 1968, charting top 40 on Billboard in January and becoming a top 3 hit in the US. The 5th Dimension would have to wait for their next album, Stoned Soul Picnic, to achieve the same chart placement. To capitalize on the success of "The Worst That Could Happen", Soul City Records re-released The Magic Garden as The Worst That Could Happen. for the US market. The re-release reverses the front and back covers of the original LP. The vinyl label still retained The Magic Garden title, Soul City label and catalog number.

Although the original Magic Garden album was released in mono in both the US (SCM-91001) and UK (LBL 83098), the reissue as The Worst That Could Happen was only released in stereo (SCS-92001).

Track listing
All songs were written by Jimmy Webb, except where noted.

Side one
"Prologue" – 1:24
"The Magic Garden" – 2:48
"Summer's Daughter" – 3:03
"Dreams/Pax/Nepenthe" – 3:24
"Carpet Man" – 3:16
"Ticket to Ride" (John Lennon, Paul McCartney) – 4:00

Side two
"Requiem: 820 Latham" – 4:26
"The Girls' Song" – 4:09
"The Worst That Could Happen" – 2:37
"Orange Air" – 2:38
"Paper Cup" – 2:48
"Epilogue" – :56

Personnel
Performers
 Billy Davis Jr. – lead vocals (track 9), background vocals 
 Florence LaRue – lead vocals (tracks 5, 8), background vocals 
 Marilyn McCoo – lead vocals (track 5, 8), background vocals 
 Lamonte McLemore – background vocals
 Ron Townson – background vocals
 Jimmy Webb – orchestra conductor

The credited musicians (roles not specified) are Hal Blaine, Joe Osborn, Larry Knechtel, Mike Deasy, Tommy Tedesco, Dennis Budimir and Johnny Rivers.

Production
 Jimmy Webb – music arranger
 Bones Howe – producer, engineer
 Armin Steiner – engineer
 Elliot Federman – audio mastering
 Mandana Eidgah – product manager
 Rob Santos – reissue producer
 Mike Hartry – digital transfers
 Joanne Feltman – archives coordinator
 Glenn Korman – archives coordinator
 Woody Woodward – art director
 Mathieu Bitton – reissue art director
 Ron Wolin – design
 Wayne Kimbell – illustrations
 Ed Osborne – photography
 George Rodriguez – photography
 Mike Ragogna – liner notes

Charts

Album
Billboard (North America)

Singles
Billboard (North America)

Cultural impact
"Carpet Man" has been covered by the Nocturnes, the Charade, the Parking Lot, and by the founder of the 5th Dimension's Soul City record label, Johnny Rivers. 
Dusty Springfield recorded a cover of "The Magic Garden", which surfaced on a Springfield anthology in the 1990s.

References

The 5th Dimension albums
1967 albums
Albums conducted by Jimmy Webb
Albums produced by Bones Howe
Albums produced by Jimmy Webb
Soul City Records (American label) albums
Albums recorded at United Western Recorders